Wallace Heron (15 June 1924 – 26 December 1990) was a New Zealand field athlete who represented his country in the pole vault at the 1950 British Empire Games.

Biography
Born in Te Kuiti on 15 June 1924, Heron was the son of Samuel George Frith Heron and Margaret Thomasine Gwendolene Heron (née Turney) who were resident at Waitanguru at the time.

Representing Auckland, Heron won five New Zealand national athletic titles, winning the pole vault every year from 1945 to 1950 except 1948. At the 1950 British Empire Games in Auckland, Heron represented New Zealand in the pole vault.

Heron died at Whangamatā on 26 December 1990, and he was buried at Pukekohe Cemetery.

References

1924 births
1990 deaths
People from Te Kūiti
Athletes (track and field) at the 1950 British Empire Games
Commonwealth Games competitors for New Zealand
New Zealand male pole vaulters
Burials at Pukekohe Cemetery